Muscadine is an unincorporated community in Cleburne County, Alabama, United States. It is near the Alabama-Georgia state line. Muscadine has a post office with ZIP code 36269, a general store, and a bar.

Demographics

Muscadine was an incorporated community for a time and was listed on the U.S. Census from 1890 to 1930. It peaked at 132 persons in 1900.

References

Unincorporated communities in Cleburne County, Alabama
Unincorporated communities in Alabama